Pauline Oberdorfer Minor (c. 1885 – January 23, 1963) was an American teacher, singer and composer who was one of the 22 founders of Delta Sigma Theta sorority.

Biography
Pauline Oberdorfer was born around 1885 in Charlottesville, Virginia.  Her mother worked as a washer woman.  Oberdorfer was sent to further her education in Philadelphia, Pennsylvania and was raised by an aunt and uncle.  She did not know her parents nor her exact date of birth.

In 1910, she graduated from the Philadelphia High School for Girls. She was a member of the Union Baptist Church in Philadelphia, sang in the choir and through the influence of Lewis B. Moore, the dean of the Howard Teacher's College, obtained a church scholarship to attend Howard University.

At Howard, Oberdorfer along with 22 fellow students, co-founded the Delta Sigma Theta sorority on January 13, 1913. She served as the first treasurer of the Alpha Chapter.  She served as president of the Teacher's Club at Howard for one year and her achievements were noted in the NAACP's Crisis magazine edited by W.E.B. DuBois.  After graduating as valedictorian of the class of 1914, she pursued a teaching career in Pennsylvania, Alabama and South Carolina.

Oberdorfer also embarked on a career as a mezzo-soprano recitalist and composer of spirituals.  Her book, Soul Echoes featured forty of her compositions including "Get Off the Judgment Seat" and "My Lord Is a Refuge".

She married a Mr. Minor, but they divorced. Oberdorfer Minor died on January 23, 1963. She was working as a housekeeper when she died and was interred in a pauper's grave alongside three other people in Eden cemetery in Collingdale, Pennsylvania.

Legacy
In 2015, a monument to Oberdorfer Minor was erected in Eden Cemetery by the Philadelphia Alumnae chapter of the Delta Sigma Theta sorority.

A scholarship at the Philadelphia High School for Girls and a college internship in Charlottesville, Virginia were established in her name.

Footnotes

References
 

1880s births
1963 deaths
African-American educators
20th-century African-American women singers
American mezzo-sopranos
American women educators
Burials at Eden Cemetery (Collingdale, Pennsylvania)
Date of birth unknown
Delta Sigma Theta founders
Delta Sigma Theta members
Educators from Virginia
Howard University alumni
People from Charlottesville, Virginia
People from Philadelphia
Philadelphia High School for Girls alumni
Year of birth uncertain